The following is a list of amusement parks in Oceania sorted by region.

Australia

Australian Capital Territory

Canberra
 Corin Forest Recreational Playground
 Downunderland (defunct)

New South Wales
 Magic Mountain, Merimbula
 Scenic World, Katoomba
 Ton-O-Fun, Forster
 Jamberoo Action Park

Sydney
 Adventure Golf at Panthers World of Entertainment Complex
 Fox Studios Australia, Royal Agricultural Society Showground), Moore Park
 KAOS-Indoor Amusement arcade
 Luna Park Sydney
 Manly Waterworks
 Sega World Sydney (defunct)
 Royal Easter Show, Homebush
 The Train Shed, Luddenham (defunct)
 Wonderland City (aka: Bondi Aquarium)
 Wonderland Sydney (defunct)

Queensland
 Paronella Park

Sunshine Coast
 Aussie World
Nostalgia Town

Brisbane
 Tops, an amusement park (1988–2000) located on the top floor of The Myer Centre Brisbane
 World Expo Park, an amusement park built for Expo 88 and closed in 1989

Gold Coast
 Dreamworld, has the third tallest free-falling ride in the world at 120 metres (39 stories) high, The Giant Drop
 Sea World
 Warner Bros. Movie World, home to the second steepest roller coaster drop in the world at 120.5 degrees, Green Lantern Coaster
 Wet'n'Wild Gold Coast
 WhiteWater World

South Australia
 Adelaide Showgrounds, Adelaide
 Dazzeland, Adelaide (defunct)

Glenelg
 Luna Park Glenelg (defunct)
 Magic Mountain (replaced by The Beachouse)

Victoria
Adventure Park, Geelong
 Funfields, Whittlesea
 Gumbuya World, Tynong (Formerly Gumbuya Park)
 Fairy Park, Geelong
 Hi-Lite Park, Geelong (defunct)
 Studio 31 (Countdown), Ripponlea (defunct 1986)
 Luna Park, Melbourne
 Melbourne Showgrounds, Ascot Vale
 Wonderland Fun Park, Melbourne
Kryal Castle, Ballarat
Sovereign hill, Ballarat

Western Australia
 Adventure World, Bibra Lake
 The Great Escape Amusement Park, Hillarys
 Kalamunda Water Park, Kalamunda
 Perth Royal Showgrounds, Claremont

New Zealand
 Auckland Adventure Park, Stillwater, Auckland
 Crystal Mountain, Henderson Valley, Auckland
 Rainbow's End, Manukau, Auckland
 Skyline Queenstown, Queenstown, Otago

See also
List of amusement parks
List of water parks in Oceania

Oceania
Amusement parks
Amusement parks